KBRK (1430 AM) was the first radio station in Brookings, South Dakota, United States, founded July 15, 1955. The studios were originally located in downtown Brookings, but later moved to the transmitter site, near the edge of town. KBRK continues to broadcast music, news, sports, and a number of public events throughout the Brookings region and surrounding communities. The tower height is 160 feet.

Format
KBRK plays a mix of both soft rock and big band music targeted at the above 35 age demographic. The station also broadcasts a wide range of local sporting events for the surrounding region, specializing in high school-level athletic events for the Brookings community. KBRK originates local news broadcasts and local area weather coverage as well. World news comes via CNN satellite.

External links
KBRK 1430 AM
Brookings Radio

BRK
Brookings, South Dakota
Alpha Media radio stations
Radio stations established in 1955
Adult standards radio stations in the United States
1955 establishments in South Dakota